Dean Anastasiadis (born 6 June 1970 in Melbourne, Australia) is a former Australian football (soccer) player.

Biography

A goalkeeper, he played for many years at a variety of clubs in the National Soccer League. This included being part of the 2000–01 championship side at Wollongong Wolves, and the 1997–98 Grand Final runner up Carlton SC side, of whom he is also the games record holder. On both occasions he played and was scored against by his brother John Anastasiadis. He retired at the end of 2008. 
Since then Anastasiadis has been coaching in the Victorian Premier League, and various State levels specializing in goalkeeper training. He also completed his Level B AFC/FFA outfield coaching diploma and Level 1 AFC/FFA goalkeeper licence. He is currently the goalkeeper coach with Melbourne Victory FC.

Honours

Club

South Melbourne FC 
VPL Championship: 2006

Dockerty Cup: 1993, 1995

NSL Cup: 1995/96

Hellenic Cup: 2007

Wollongong Wolves 
 National Soccer League Championship: 2000–01

Personal honours
 Victorian Premier League Goalkeeper of the Year: 2005, 2006

External links
 Aussie Footballers Anastasiadis to Arcaba

1970 births
Living people
Australian soccer players
Soccer players from Melbourne
Australian people of Greek descent
Association football goalkeepers
Australia international soccer players
National Soccer League (Australia) players
Carlton S.C. players
Port Melbourne SC players
South Melbourne FC players
Wollongong Wolves FC players
Collingwood Warriors S.C. players
2002 OFC Nations Cup players